Wo Che Estate is a public housing estate in Sha Tin, New Territories, Hong Kong. It is the second public housing estate in Sha Tin, built on the reclaimed land of Sha Tin Hoi, located near Fung Wo Estate, Lek Yuen Estate and Sha Tin Sports Ground. The estate consists of thirteen residential blocks completed in 1977, 1980 and 2003 respectively.

History
On 22 February 2021, an eight-year-old girl was assaulted by a man wearing a purple mask in his 20s at the estate.

Houses

Demographics
According to the 2016 by-census, Wo Che Estate had a population of 18,575. The median age was 46.8 and the majority of residents (97.4 per cent) were of Chinese ethnicity. The average household size was 3 people. The median monthly household income of all households (i.e. including both economically active and inactive households) was HK$22,490.

Politics
For the 2019 District Council election, the estate fell within two constituencies. Most of the estate is located in the Wo Che Estate constituency, which was formerly represented by Raymond Li Chi-wang until October 2021, while King Wo House falls within the Lek Yuen constituency, which was formerly represented by Jimmy Sham Tsz-kit until July 2021.

COVID-19 pandemic
King Wo House of the estate was put under lockdown between 19 and 20 February 2022. Foo Wo House was also in lockdown since 26 February. Man Wo House and Yan Wo House was sealed on 27 February. Shun Wo House house was put under lockdown on 28 February 2022.

See also

Public housing estates in Sha Tin

References

Residential buildings completed in 1977
Residential buildings completed in 1980
Residential buildings completed in 2003
Wo Che
Public housing estates in Hong Kong